Wilson Edwin Cain (April 12, 1887 – June 26, 1969) was a provincial politician from Alberta, Canada. He served as a member of the Legislative Assembly of Alberta from 1935 to 1955, sitting with the Social Credit caucus in government.

References

Alberta Social Credit Party MLAs
1969 deaths
1869 births
People from Perth, Ontario